was a weekly Japanese TV show featuring members of Morning Musume, and sometimes other Hello! Project members on TV Tokyo. On April 1, 2007, the show ended after seven years of broadcast. A new show featuring the same people, entitled , took its place. The program is best known outside Japan due to the "Dramatic Chipmunk," an online phenomenon video. The video is from the seventh episode of the segment Minimoni Chiccha, with Mari Yaguchi, Mika Todd, Nozomi Tsuji and Ai Kago. In the episode, the girls plan on having a pet so an employee from a pet store brings in some animals for the girls to look over.

Contents 

In addition to the segments listed below, many other one-time segments run as well.

 Hello! Project Product segments
 
  
 
 
 
 
 
 
 
 
 
 
 
 
 
 
 
 
 
 
 
 
 
 
 
 
 
 Mini Moni Chiccha

External links 
 

Japanese variety television shows
2000 Japanese television series debuts
2007 Japanese television series endings
TV Tokyo original programming
Hello! Project